The Battle of Cronium (c. 376 BCE) was part of the Sicilian Wars and took place in Sicily. A Syracusan army, led by Dionysius I, was defeated by a Carthaginian army, led by Himilco Mago, Mago II's son. The Carthaginians won the day having routed the enemy army. Leptines, Dionysius' brother, was killed during the battle. The location of Cronium is considered to be close to modern Palermo.

Background
Dionysius, the tyrant of Syracuse, having concluded a peace treaty with the Carthaginians after the Battle of Chrysas, was looking for a reason to renew the war. He found one when the subjugated cities of the Carthaginians started a revolt. Dionysius allied himself with the cities. The Carthaginians sent envoys to Dionysius to ask for the return of their subject cities, but they were ignored, so the war was renewed. The Carthaginians sent an army to Sicily to confront Dionysius. Their army, however, was defeated at Cabala. The Carthaginian King-general, Mago II, died in battle and his son, Himilco Margo, became the new general. The Carthaginians had concluded a truce for a few days, but having expired, the two armies confronted each other again, this time at Cronium.

Battle
The battle started with a tough fight on one of the Syracusan wings, where Leptines was stationed. Leptines was said to have died a glorious death, having killed many enemies. At his fall the Carthaginians were emboldened; they began pushing and were able to rout their enemies. Dionysius, whose troops were a select band, were winning the fight, but after having received the news of the fall of Leptines and the defeat of the other wing, they were dismayed and took flight. When the rout became general, the Carthaginians pursued the more eagerly and called out to one another to take no captives; and so all those who were caught were put to death. The Syracusan casualties were found to number more than fourteen thousand.

Aftermath
After this great victory, the Carthaginians returned to Panormus. They sent envoys to Dionysius and gave him the chance to end the war. The tyrant accepted the envoys' offer, and a truce was concluded. This included that both sides kept their territory, but with only one exception, the Carthaginians receiving Selinous and Acragas. Dionysius had to pay the Carthaginians 1,000 talents.

References

Battles of the Sicilian Wars
4th-century BC conflicts
Ancient Sicily
Military history of Sicily